The 2007 Russian Figure Skating Championships took place between 4 and 7 January 2007 in Moscow. Skaters competed at the senior level in the disciplines of men's singles, ladies' singles, pair skating, and ice dancing. The juniors event was held separately.

Senior results

Men

Ladies

Pairs

Ice dancing

Junior results
The 2007 Russian Junior Championships were held in Samara on February 1–4, 2007. It was the qualifying event for the 2007 World Junior Championships. The 1st through 3rd places in men, pairs, and ice dancing qualified for the World Junior Championships. The 1st and 2nd places in ladies qualified.

Men

Ladies

Pairs

Ice dancing

External links

 Results at the Russian Skating Federation
 The results of the Juniors
 goldenskate report

Russian Figure Skating Championships
Russian Figure Skating Championships
Sports competitions in Moscow
Figure skating
2007 in Moscow